Norman Gardens is a suburb in the Rockhampton Region, Queensland, Australia. In the  Norman Gardens had a population of 9,944 people.

Geography 
Norman Gardens is bounded by the Bruce Highway to the west, the Yeppoon Road to the north and by Moores Creek (a tributary of the Fitzroy River) to the south. The main Rockhampton campus of the Central Queensland University is in the north-west corner of suburb on the corner of the Bruce Highway and the Yeppoon Road. The North Rockhampton Cemetery is located in the south-west of the suburb on the corner of the Bruce Highway and Moores Creek Road with the rest of area along the Bruce Highway being commercial premises with the residential areas behind them to the east.

The western side of the locality is relatively flat (30–50 metres above sea level) and is cleared and developed. This land is mostly undeveloped apart from a quarry at Peak Hill.

Road infrastructure
The Rockhampton-Yeppoon Road (as Yaamba Road) runs along the western boundary, concurrent with the Bruce Highway, and along the northern boundary (as Yeppoon Road).

History
St Nicholas' Catholic Primary School was officially opened by Archbishop James Duhig on Sunday 22 November 1908 in Koongal. It was operated by the Sisters of Mercy.  On 14 July 1981, the school relocated to Norman Gardens, where it was renamed  St Anthony’s.

Norman Park Christian School opened in January 1994 with 25 students. It was an initiative of the Norman Park Baptist Church. In 2004 it was renamed Lighthouse Christian School.

St Stanislaus College, a Catholic boys secondary school, opened in 1958 and Marian College, a Catholic girls secondary school, opened in 1964. These schools merged to form Emmaus College, a co-educational Catholic secondary school, opening on 1 February 1983.

In the  Norman Gardens had a population of 9,944 people.

Education 
St Anthony's Catholic Primary School is a private primary (Prep-6) school at 390b Feez Street.

Lighthouse Christian School is a private primary and secondary (Prep-12) school for boys and girls at 480 Norman Road. In 2018, the school had an enrolment of 238 students with 20 teachers (18 full-time equivalent) and 21 non-teaching staff (15 full-time equivalent).

Emmaus College is a Catholic secondary school for boys and girls in Rockhampton.  It has its Years 7-9 campus at 362 Yaamba Road. Its Years 7-9 campus is in Norman Gardens. In 2018, the school had an enrolment of 1,274 students with 102 teachers (95 full-time equivalent) and 69 non-teaching staff (54 full-time equivalent).

Central Queensland University has its Rockhampton North Campus in the suburb.

Facilities 
North Rockhampton Cemetery is at 350-360 Yaamba Road in the south of the suburb.

Amenities 
Churches in the suburb include:

 Holy Family Catholic Church, 390 Feez Street
Rockhampton Baptist Tabernacle, 650 Norman Road
Lighthouse Baptist Church, 480 Norman Road

Bluebirds United Sports Club is a sports centre.

Big Bulls 
On the median strip of the Bruce Highway on the border of Park Avenue and Norman Gardens (opposite #411) is one of the seven Big Bulls statues that decorate Rockhampton, which regards itself as the Beef Capital of Australia. The Park Avenue/Norman Gardens statue is of a Braham bull. The Big Bulls are listed as one of Australia's big things.

References

External links